A Streak of Luck is a 1925 American silent Western film directed by Richard Thorpe and starring Jay Wilsey, Dorothy Wood and Nelson McDowell.

Synopsis
A playboy is disowned by his banker father after getting his name in the newspapers too often. He decides to head West where he falls in love and enjoys a series of adventures.

Cast
 Jay Wilsey as Billy Burton 
 Dorothy Wood as Francie Oliver
 Nelson McDowell as Big Ben Tuttle
 Bertram Marburgh as Mr. Burton
 Slim Whitaker as Black Pete 
 Fred Holmes as Burton's Valet
 George Y. Harvey as Police Officer
 Edward Klein as Burton's Secretary
 John M. O'Brien as Jack Hurst 
 Norbert A. Myles as Sam Kellman

References

Bibliography
 Connelly, Robert B. The Silents: Silent Feature Films, 1910-36, Volume 40, Issue 2. December Press, 1998.
 Munden, Kenneth White. The American Film Institute Catalog of Motion Pictures Produced in the United States, Part 1. University of California Press, 1997.

External links
 

1925 films
1925 Western (genre) films
1920s English-language films
American silent feature films
Silent American Western (genre) films
American black-and-white films
Films directed by Richard Thorpe
1920s American films